The 1999 Advanta Championships of Philadelphia singles was the tennis singles event of the seventeenth edition of the Advanta Championships of Philadelphia; a WTA Tier II tournament held in Philadelphia. Steffi Graf was the defending champion but retired after Wimbledon earlier in the year.

After losing in last year's final, World No. 2 Lindsay Davenport won the title this year, defeating World No. 1 Martina Hingis, 6–3, 6–4.

Seeds
The top four seeds received a bye to the second round.

Draw

Finals

Top half

Bottom half

Qualifying

Seeds

Qualifiers

Lucky losers

Qualifying draw

First qualifier

Second qualifier

Third qualifier

Fourth qualifier

External links
 1999 Advanta Championships of Philadelphia Draw 

Advanta Championships of Philadelphia
Advanta Championships of Philadelphia